Vaïsse is a surname. Notable people with the surname include:

Claude-Marius Vaïsse (1799–1864), French politician
Justin Vaïsse (born 1973), French historian and intellectual
Martin Vaïsse, French tennis player
Maurice Vaïsse (born 1942), French historian